The Knockout Kid is a 1925 American silent Western comedy film directed by Albert S. Rogell and starring Jack Perrin, Molly Malone, and Eva Thatcher.

Plot
As described in a film magazine review, Jack is the son of a millionaire, and keen on amateur boxing. He knocks out “One Round” Sweeney in a bout at an athletic club and is denounced by his father. He is disinherited and goes to Texas in  his Packard car, accompanied by his dog and  valet Snowball. His car and clothes are stolen and he is about to be hung for “rustling” cattle, of which he is innocent. The only thing that can save him is marriage with the Widow Jenkins who owns the cattle ranch. He clears his name, however, and marries the widow's cute niece Jenny instead.

Cast

References

External links
 

1925 films
1920s Western (genre) comedy films
1920s English-language films
American black-and-white films
American boxing films
Films directed by Albert S. Rogell
Rayart Pictures films
1925 comedy films
Silent American Western (genre) comedy films
1920s American films